Cherian J. Kappan (also spelled as Kappen) was a Freedom fighter, Indian National Congress leader, Member of the Travancore–Cochin Legislative Assembly and Member of Parliament from Kerala, India. He was a member of Travancore State Legislature from 1948 to 1951 and M.L.A. in Travancore-Cochin Legislative Assembly from 1952 to 1954. Cherian represented Ramapuram constituency as a Congress Parliamentary Party candidate in Travancore-Cochin Legislative Assembly. He represented Muvattupuzha constituency in third Lok Sabha (1962–67). He was the first chairman of the Pala Municipality.

Biography
Cherian J. Kappan was born on March 26, 1911, at Pala, Kottayam district to Eapen and Thresiamma. After his primary education from St. Thomas E. H. School, Palai, he done his graduation from St. Joseph's College, Trichi and St. Thomas College, Trichur.

After graduating from the Thiruvananthapuram Law College, Cherian started practicing as an advocate in courts in Kottayam and Pala. At first he worked jointly with P. T. Chacko, but soon became an independent lawyer. Due to severe financial pressure, Kappan shifted his legal practice to Kozhikode, but soon returned to Pala.

As an activist in Indian independence movement, Cherian was imprisoned for  years. Kappan also made strong speeches against Diwan Sir CP's idea of independent Travancore, instead of being part of the Indian Union.

Cherian died in 1982.

Political career
Initially, Kappan's public activity was limited to the communal and social spheres. But he soon gained wide public attention as he spearheaded the agitation against Sir CP's education policies. Subsequently, he became active in the State Congress movement. He was arrested and imprisoned several times after gaining the Diwan's displeasure.

Cherian was a member of Travancore State Legislature from 1948 to 1951. From 1951 to 1954 he was M.L.A. in Travancore-Cochin Legislative Assembly. Cherian represented Ramapuram constituencyas a Congress Parliamentary Party candidate in the Travancore-Cochin Legislative Assembly. He represented Muvattupuzha constituency in third Lok Sabha. He was the first chairman of the Pala Nagarasabha. He held several other positions including District Congress Committee President, President of Dist. Coperative Bank, Kottayam, executive committee member of State Cooperative Bank, presidentof Pepper Marketing Cooperative Society, Pala, president of Meenachil Taluka Library Union and Vice president of Catholica Congress.

The Kappan family is the main political rival of K. M. Mani's family in Pala. Mani and the Kappan family were not opposed at first. Mani started his practice as a lawyer as a junior to Cherian. But when Cherian Kappan testified against Mani in an election case, the two fell out. The Kappan family and Mani became politically opposed. Mani's first opponent from the Kappan family was Cherian's son George C. Kappan, who fought against him in Kerala Legislative Assembly election in 1991. Cherian's another son Mani C. Kappan fought against K. M. Mani in 2006, 2011 and 2016 Legislative Assembly elections, but lost in all. Mani C. Kappan defeated Kerala Congress (M) leader and K. M. Mani's son Jose K. Mani in the 2021 Kerala Assembly elections.

Honors
Cherian J. Kappan Memorial Municipal Stadium in Pala is named after him. The stadium was given the name when the industrial training center in the municipality named after Cherian was closed.

References

Lok Sabha members from Kerala
1911 births
1982 deaths
People from Pala, Kerala
Indian National Congress politicians from Kerala
Indian independence activists from Kerala
India MPs 1962–1967
Travancore–Cochin MLAs 1952–1954
Politicians from Kottayam